SS Henry B. Plant was a Liberty ship built in the United States during World War II. She was named after Henry B. Plant, an American businessman, entrepreneur, investor involved with many transportation interests and projects, mostly railroads, in the southeastern United States. In the 1880s, most of his accumulated railroad and steamship lines were combined into the Plant System, which later became part of the Atlantic Coast Line Railroad.

Construction
Henry B. Plant was laid down on 9 November 1944, under a Maritime Commission (MARCOM) contract, MC hull 2510, by the St. Johns River Shipbuilding Company, Jacksonville, Florida; she was sponsored by Agnes Veronica O'Mahoney, the wife of the US Senator Joseph C. O'Mahoney, from Wyoming, and was launched on 11 December 1944.

History
She was allocated to the A.L.Burbank & Co.Ltd., on 19 December 1944. Henry B. Plant had been transporting  of cargo, originating in New York, to Antwerp. With no time to evade, a torpedo struck the #4 hold. At the time she had a crew of eight officers, 33 crewmen, and 28 Armed Guards, she was also carrying one passenger, an Army security officer. One lifeboat and four rafts were launched, but one officer, eight crewmen, and seven Armed Guards were drowned.

References

Bibliography

 
 
 
 
 
 

 

Liberty ships
Ships built in Jacksonville, Florida
1944 ships
Maritime incidents in February 1945